Carmen is a given name with two different origins. Its first root is Spanish and Italian and used as a nickname for Carmel and Carmelo (respectively), from Hebrew karmel ("God's vineyard"), which is the name of a mountain range in northern Israel. 

The second origin is from Latin carmen, which means "ode" or "poem" ("Patrium Carmen": ode to the fatherland) and is also the root of the English word "charm". The name of the Roman goddess Carmenta based on this root comes from the purely Latin origin, as is the fragment of archaic Latin known as "Carmen Saliare". In English, the name is unisex; in Spanish (Carmen), Portuguese (Carmo), Catalan (Carme), French and Romanian (Carmen) it is generally female, though the Italian variant Carmine is frequently male.

Spanish name 
As a Spanish given name, it is usually part of the devotional compound names María del Carmen, Nuestra Señora del Carmen (Our Lady of Carmen), or Virgen del Carmen (in English, Our Lady of Mount Carmel), stemming from the tradition of the vision of Mary, mother of Jesus on 16 July 1251 by Simon Stock, head of the Carmelite order.

People 
 Carmen Alguindingue, Venezuelan professor and activist, appointed as ambassador to Andorra
 Carmen Argenziano, American actor
 Carmen Basilio, American professional boxer
 Carmen Bernand, French historian and Latin Americanist
 Carmen Calisto, former Ecuadorian first lady
 Carmen Campagne (1959–2018), Canadian singer
 Carmen Carrera, American reality television personality, model and burlesque performer
 Carmen Cavallaro, American pianist
 Carmen Conde, Spanish poet
 Carmen Cozza, American football and baseball player
 Carmen Dorantes Martínez, Mexican politician 
 Carmen Dragon, American conductor, composer and arranger
 Carmen Ennesch, Luxembourgish-French journalist, writer, and historian
 Carmen Espinoza-Rodriquez, American singer-songwriter
 Carmen Ejogo, British actress and singer
 Carmen Electra, American actress
 Carmen Fanzone, former Major League Baseball player and horn player
 Carmen Febres-Cordero de Ballén (1829–1893), Ecuadorian writer, poet
 Carmen Garayalde (1913–2002), Uruguayan teacher, exiled political activist, and artist
 Carmen Herrera, Cuban-born artist
 Carmen Hillinger, German Paralympic wheelchair fencer
 Carmen Kass, Estonian supermodel
 Carmen Labaki, Lebanese / Brazilian movie director and producer
 Carmen Laforet, Spanish author
 Carmen Lombardo, Canadian-American jazz saxophonist and vocalist
 Carmen Maciariello, American college basketball coach
 Carmen Martín Gaite, Spanish author
 Carmen Maura, Spanish actress
 Carmen McRae, American jazz singer
 Carmen Milano, American lawyer and gangster
 Carmen Miranda, Portuguese-Brazilian samba singer and film star
 Carmen Nebel, German television presenter 
 Carmen Olmedo (1909–1985), Peruvian actress, dancer, songwriter, vedette
 Carmen A. Orechio, American politician
 Carmen Osbahr, American puppeteer
 Carmen Perrin (born 1953), Bolivian-born Swiss visual artist, designer, and educator
 Carmen Policy, American attorney and American football executive
 Carmen Radu, former CEO of Eximbank Romania
 Carmen Rinke, Canadian boxer
 Carmen Rizzo, American record producer
 Carmen Rodríguez (politician) (born 1949), Bolivian politician
 Carmen Rupe (1936–2011), New Zealand-Australian LGBT activist and drag-queen
 Carmen Salvino, American professional bowler
 Carmen Scardine, American football
 Carmen Silva, Brazilian actress
 Carmen Silvera, British actress
 Carmen Sylva, pen name of Elisabeth of Wied, queen of Romania.
 Carmen Suleiman, Egyptian singer
 Carmen Trutanich, American politician
 Carmen Vidal, Spanish cosmetologist

Fictional characters with the name Carmen 
 Carmen, the main character in Prosper Mérimée's novella Carmen (1845), which is the basis for Georges Bizet's opera Carmen
 Carmen (Lana Del Rey song), titular character in a song by American singer-songwriter Lana Del Rey, taken from her second studio album Born to Die
 Carmen Diaz, a supporting character in Netflix's Cobra Kai in which she is the mother of Miguel Diaz and love interest of Johnny Lawrence (character) 
 Carmen, a character from the movie, Happy Feet Two
 Carmen, a character from the 2002 Indonesian drama movie, Ada Apa Dengan Cinta.
 Carmen, Humbert Humbert's term of endearment for the titular character of Nabokov's Lolita
 Carmen Cortez, a character from the Spy Kids trilogy
 Carmen de la Pica Morales, character on Showtime's lesbian drama, The L Word
 Carmen Diaz is an aspiring dancer, singer, and actress in the musical, Fame (musical)
 Carmen Lopez (character), a fictional character from the TV series, George Lopez
 Carmen Lowell, character from the Sisterhood of the Traveling Pants series
 Carmen Pryde, father of X-Men character Kitty Pryde
 Carmen Sandiego, character from the Where in the World is Carmen Sandiego? franchise
 Carmen, supporting character of Totally Spies! in which she is the mother of super spy Alex
Carmen, a villager in the Nintendo video game Animal Crossing
 Carmen, the main character in Colombian TV series, Always a Witch
 Carmen "Carmy" Berzatto, the main character in the American comedy-drama series The Bear (TV series)

Fictional characters with the name Carmela 
 Carmela Corleone, the wife of Don Vito Corleone in the books and movies based on Mario Puzo's novel, The Godfather (1969)
 Carmela Soprano, leading female character on HBO's series, The Sopranos
 Cousin Carmela, a character from Wizards of Waverly Place and its TV special The Wizards Return: Alex vs. Alex

See also
Carmin (disambiguation), includes list of people with name Carmin

References

External links 
 Behindthename website
 Thinkbabynames website

Spanish unisex given names
Romanian feminine given names